Solemya elarraichensis is a species of marine bivalve mollusc in the family Solemyidae. It is endemic to the deep-water mud volcano slopes in the Gulf of Cadiz in the eastern Atlantic Ocean.

Description
The fragile valves are equal in size and subcylindrical, with the beaks nearer the posterior end. The beaks are indistinct and the umbos sunken, and there are no hinge teeth. The ligament connecting the valves is primarily internal. The exterior of the shell is sculpted by fine radial ridges, about five at the posterior end and eleven at the anterior end. The shell has a persistent thin periostracum which extends beyond the valve margins. It is yellowish-brown at first but darkens with age.

Distribution and habitat
Solemya elarraichensis is endemic to the volcanic area in the Gulf of Cadiz, off the coast of Spain. The whole area is under compressive deformation and mud volcanism and the processes associated with the escape of hydrocarbon-rich fluids sustain a broad diversity of chemosynthetic organisms.

References

Solemyidae
Molluscs described in 2011